The 2020–21 season was the Wellington Phoenix's 14th season since its establishment in 2007. The club participated in the A-League for the 14th time.

Pre-season

On 27 August 2020, it was announced that Liberato Cacace had signed with Belgian club Sint-Truidense after they had paid a transfer fee of $2,100,000. On 6 September, the Phoenix announced that Callum McCowatt signed with Danish club Helsingør following the conclusion of his contract. On 12 September, it was announced that Gary Hooper had departed the club following the conclusion of his contract. On 14 September, the Phoenix announced the shock departure of captain Steven Taylor after mutually agreeing to terminate his contract. Both players joined the Indian Super League, signing with Kerala Blasters and Odisha, respectively. On 24 September, Phoenix youngster Callan Elliot signed a deal with Xanthi. On 18 October, it was reported that Matti Steinmann had signed with Indian club East Bengal despite no announcement from the Phoenix. On 19 October, it was announced that Brandon Wilson would be parting ways with the Phoenix. A week later, it was confirmed that Walter Scott would not extend his contract with the club, after he played as a trialist for Macarthur FC in a pre-season match.

On 15 October, it was announced that the 2020–21 A-League season would commence on the 27th of December. On 27 October, the Phoenix confirmed that their squad will move to Australia for the start of the new campaign. On 28 October 2020, the Phoenix announced the dual signings of All Whites Clayton Lewis and James McGarry on one-year deals.  On 30 October, it was announced Joshua Laws had signed a one-year deal with the Phoenix.  On 6 November, it was announced that Matthew Ridenton had returned to the Phoenix on a one-year deal.  On 10 November, the Phoenix announced the signing of Mirza Muratovic on a one-year deal.  On 30 November, the Phoenix announced the signing of Israeli International Tomer Hemed, as its marquee player on a one-year contract.

Players

Transfers

From youth squad

Transfers in

Transfers out

Contract extensions

Technical staff

Squad statistics

Appearances and goals

{| class="wikitable sortable plainrowheaders" style="text-align:center"
|-
! rowspan="2" |
! rowspan="2" |
! rowspan="2" style="width:190px;" |Player
! colspan="2" style="width:87px;" |A-League
! colspan="2" style="width:87px;" |Total
|-
!
!Goals
!
!Goals
|-
|1
|
! scope="row" | Stefan Marinovic

|6
|0

!6
!0
|-
|2
|
! scope="row" | Liam McGing

|6(1)
|0

!7
!0
|-
|3
|
! scope="row" | Luke DeVere

|6
|0

!6
!0
|-
|4
|
! scope="row" | Te Atawhai Hudson-Wihongi

|0(4)
|0

!4
!0
|-
|5
|
! scope="row" | James McGarry

|15(3)
|0

!18
!0
|-
|6
|
! scope="row" | Tim Payne

|19
|0

!19
!0
|-
|7
|
! scope="row" | Reno Piscopo

|8(1)
|1

!9
!1
|-
|8
|
! scope="row" | Cameron Devlin

|11(6)
|1

!17
!1
|-
|9
|
! scope="row" | David Ball

|17
|4

!17
!4
|-
|10
|
! scope="row" | Ulises Dávila

|18(1)
|7

!19
!7
|-
|11
|
! scope="row" | Jaushua Sotirio

|6(7)
|3

!13
!3
|-
|12
|
! scope="row" | Matthew Ridenton

|2(6)
|0

!8
!0
|-
|13
|
! scope="row" | Charles Lokolingoy

|0(7)
|0

!7
!0
|-
|14
|
! scope="row" | Alex Rufer

|15(1)
|0

!16
!0
|-
|15
|
! scope="row" | Mirza Muratovic

|3(5)
|2

!8
!2
|-
|16
|
! scope="row" | Louis Fenton

|12(5)
|2

!17
!2
|-
|17
|
! scope="row" | Tomer Hemed

|9(5)
|5

!14
!5
|-
|18
|
! scope="row" | Ben Waine

|9(6)
|6

!15
!5
|-
|19
|
! scope="row" | Sam Sutton

|3(2)
|0

!5
!0
|-
|20
|
! scope="row" | Oliver Sail

|13
|0

!13
!0
|-
|21
|
! scope="row" | Joshua Laws

|10(2)
|0

!12
!0
|-
|23
|
! scope="row" | Clayton Lewis

|17(2)
|1

!19
!1
|-
|27
|
! scope="row" | Steven Taylor

|3(2)
|0

!5
!0
|}

Friendlies

Competitions

Overall

Overview
{|class="wikitable" style="text-align:left"
|-
!rowspan=2 style="width:140px;"|Competition
!colspan=8|Record
|-
!style="width:30px;"|
!style="width:30px;"|
!style="width:30px;"|
!style="width:30px;"|
!style="width:30px;"|
!style="width:30px;"|
!style="width:30px;"|
!style="width:50px;"|
|-
|A-League

|-
!Total

A-League

League table

Results summary

Matches

References

Wellington Phoenix FC seasons
2020–21 A-League season by team